Woodbine may refer to:

 Woodbine (plant), a common name for several plants

Places

Australia 
 Woodbine, New South Wales, a suburb of Sydney
 Woodbine, Queensland

Canada 
 Woodbine, Calgary, Alberta, a neighbourhood

Toronto, Ontario 
 Woodbine (electoral district), a provincial electoral district from 1926 to 1966
 Beaches—Woodbine (provincial electoral district), a provincial electoral district from 1966 to 1996
 Beaches—Woodbine, a federal electoral district now called Beaches—East York
 Woodbine Avenue, an arterial road
 Woodbine Beach, a beach
 Woodbine Race Course, later called Greenwood Raceway, a defunct horse racing facility
 Woodbine Racetrack, a horse racing facility
 Woodbine Centre, a shopping centre
 Woodbine station, subway station
 Woodbine, Old East York, a neighbourhood

United States 
 Woodbine, Delaware
 Woodbine, Georgia
 Woodbine (New Albany, Indiana), a historic estate
 Woodbine, Illinois
 Woodbine, Iowa
 Woodbine, Kansas
 Woodbine, Kentucky
 Woodbine, Maryland
 Woodbine, New Jersey
 Woodbine, West Virginia
 Woodbine, Pennsylvania
 Woodbine, Texas
 Woodbine Formation, a Late Cretaceous geological formation in east Texas
 Woodbine Park, Los Angeles, California
 Woodbine Township, Jo Daviess County, Illinois

People
 Bokeem Woodbine (born 1973), U.S. actor
 O'Brian Woodbine (born 1988), Jamaican soccer player
 Francis Woodbine Blackman (1922–2010), Caribbean author
 Thomas Woodbine Hinchliff (1825–1882), British mountaineer
 Woodbine Parish (1796–1882), British diplomat
 Lord Woodbine (1929–2000), Trinidadian music producer

Characters
 Lazlo Woodbine, a fictional character created by Robert Rankin

Other uses
 Woodbine (cigarette), a cigarette brand
 Woodbine Entertainment Group, operator of the Woodbine Racetrack, Toronto, Ontario, Canada
 , a buoy tender of the United States Coast Guard
 USS Woodbine (1913), a ship of the U.S. Navy

See also 

 Woodbine Historic District (disambiguation)
 Woodbine Municipal Airport (disambiguation)
 Woodbine Schools (disambiguation)
 
 
 Wood (disambiguation)
 Bine (disambiguation)